The women's half marathon event at the 2007 Summer Universiade was held on 11 August.

Results

References
Results

Half
2007 in women's athletics
2007